Pseudotropheus galanos is a species of cichlid endemic to Lake Malawi.  This species can reach a length of  SL.

References

galanos
Fish described in 2002
Taxonomy articles created by Polbot